Fortuna (Korfbalvereniging Fortuna) is a Dutch korfball club located in Delft, Netherlands. The club was founded on 3 February 1957 and they play their home games in the Fortuna-Hal. The team plays in white/red vertically striped shirts and black shorts / skirts.

History

General history
Fortuna was founded on 3 February 1957 by Chris Bezuyen, Ria Boer, Jan Bonthuis, Ria Rongen, Arie Rongen en Ineke Rosier. The club expanded rapidly, mainly by korfbal played at elementary schools. By that time, Fortuna was already the fourth korfball club in Delft. However Fortuna is the youngest club of the city, it always had the highest ambitions. 

Fortuna rapidly turned out to be a club playing on the highest national levels and for the last 30 years it has acted on the Hoofdklasse and Korfbal League, with the exception of 1 season. 

Fortuna also won the Dutch national championships a few times; 4 times indoors and 2 times outdoors.

Over de last years, the full name of the club changed due to new partnerships with their main sponsor. In 2004 the name became Fortuna/Tempus. In 2009 the name changed to Fortuna/MHIR. In 2014 the name changed to Fortuna/MyCollections and the last name change came in 2015 when it changed into Fortuna/Delta Logistiek.

Fortuna own its own outdoor fields and indoor hall.

Successes
National Champion indoor (5 times)
1983, 1990, 2003, 2004, 2019

National Champion outdoor (2 times)
1985, 1986

Europacup (3 times)
2004, 2005, 2020

FKS
Every year Fortuna hosts its own FKS tournament. This 2 days annual tournament is held in preparation of the upcoming Korfbal League season.
Four Korfbal League teams compete for the FKS title.

The current FKS champion is PKC/SWK Groep.

 = final match got cancelled due to moist issues in the hall.

Miscellaneous awards
Fortuna frequently participates in tournaments. By doing this, the club won several awards. Here a short overview

Haagse Korfbaldagen (12 time champion)

This tournament held in The Hague has been around since 1985 and features clubs from The Hague area. This tournament is held before the Korfbal League season starts.
Fortuna won this tournament in 1990, 1994, 1998, 1999, 2002, 2003, 2004, 2005, 2006, 2007, 2010 en 2011.
However, after 2011 Fortuna decided no longer to participate in this tournament any more, due to the busy preparation schedule in September/October. 

Korfbal Challenge (3 time champion)

The Korfbal Challenge is an international tournament which is being held in Rotterdam between Christmas and New Years Day.
Only 2 Korfbal League clubs are granted access to this tournament; only the 2 finalists of the Korfbal League Finals from that year. Besides that, this tournament features teams from other countries, such as Belgium, Taiwan, Spain or Czech Republic. 

The Korfbal Challenge is besides being a high class tournament also a moment where the KNKV tries out possible new rules of the game. Some experiments are being rejected quickly, but also some experiments are turned into new international rules. This way, the game tries to keep up and lift dynamics or speed of the game.

Fortuna has won this tournament 3 times, in 2003, 2004 and 2012.

Annual National Individual KNKV Awards 

Ard Korporaal & Damien Folkerts : 'Coach of the Year' for season 2017-2018

Daan Preuninger: 'Best Player <21' for season 2015-2016

Barry Schep: 'Player of the Year' for season  2012-2013

Mirjam Maltha: 'Player of the Year' for season  2012-2013

Barry Schep: 'Player of the Year' for season  2011-2012

Barry Schep: 'Player of the Year' for season  2010-2011

Heleen van der Wilt: 'Player of the Year' for season  2003-2004

Barbara Schouls: 'Talent of the Year' for season  2002-2003

Hans Heemskerk: 'Coach of the Year' for season  2002-2003

Marloes Preuninger: 'Player of the Year' for season 2002-2003

Barry Schep: 'Talent of the Year' for season  2000-2001

Hans Heemskerk: 'Player of the Year' for season  1983-1984

Current squad
Squad for the 2018-19 season - Updated: October 2018

Headcoaches: Damien Folkerts and Ard Korporaal

Women
   Manon Brand
   Mirthe van Staalduinen
   Eva van der Zon
   Jessica Lokhorst
   Sanne Alsem
   Mirjam Maltha
   Fleur Hoek
   Eline Entken
   Michelle van Geffen
   Claire van Oosten
   Roos van Groen

Men
   Daan Preuninger
   Merijn Sevenhuysen
   Sijmen van den Bergh
   Jord Bezemer
   Sven Bezemer
   Kaj Esser
   Tim Heemskerk
   Nik van der Steen
   Thomas Reijgersberg
   Marcel Segaar
   Joren van Nieuwenhuyzen
   Jordi Kouwenhoven

References

External links
 

Korfball teams in the Netherlands